Rory o' the Bogs is a 1913 American short film. Harold Lloyd has an uncredited role.

Cast
 J. Warren Kerrigan as Rory o' the Bogs
 William Walters
 Edith Bostwick
 Jessalyn Van Trump
 George Periolat
 William Abbott
 Harold Lloyd as Posse Member (uncredited)

See also
 Harold Lloyd filmography

References

External links

1913 films
American silent short films
American black-and-white films
Films directed by J. Farrell MacDonald
1913 short films
1910s American films